Ronaldo Villanueva Puno (born April 25, 1948), also known as Ronnie Puno, is a campaign manager and strategist in Philippine politics. He supported the presidential bids of eventual winners Fidel V. Ramos, Joseph Estrada, and Gloria Macapagal Arroyo. Puno was also responsible for the campaign of Vice President and UNA presidential candidate Jejomar Binay for the 2016 election.

He was a former interior secretary of the Philippines, and was a representative in Congress. He is also the leader of Kampi, the chief administration party of Gloria Macapagal Arroyo.

Career
Puno has a Bachelor of Arts Degree in Political Science from the Ateneo de Manila University and Masteral Credits from Johns Hopkins University School of Advanced International Studies and has 35 years of extensive experience in business and public relations and administration. Serving the Philippine government for the past 22 years has brought him to assignments as a diplomat in Washington, D.C., enabled him to interact with representatives and officials of the U.S. and the Philippine government in the areas of political and private business cultures, customs, strategy formulation and decision-making processes.

Representative of Antipolo City
He was elected Representative of the First District of Antipolo City on May 10, 2004, and declared winner by the Local Board of Canvassers on May 14, 2004. He is the President of the Political Party KAMPI (Kabalikat ng Malayang Pilipino). He is also
the Chairman of Pacific Sunrise International Holdings, Inc. and the chairman of the Board of his family business in West Virginia, United States, the North River Mountain Ranch.

Reappointment as DILG Secretary
On September 3, 2007, President Gloria Macapagal Arroyo designated  Puno, DILG Secretary, as presidential adviser on political affairs in a concurrent capacity, replacing OIC, National Security Adviser Norberto Gonzales. Puno is president on leave of her party, the Kabalikat ng Malayang Pilipino. The Commission on Appointments (CA) finally confirmed on June 11, 2008, en masse several top government officials, including Puno amid walk outs by Senators Jamby Madrigal and Panfilo Lacson.

External links

References

1948 births
Kapampangan people
Living people
People from Antipolo
Ateneo de Manila University alumni
Johns Hopkins University alumni
Lakas–CMD (1991) politicians
Lakas–CMD politicians
National Unity Party (Philippines) politicians
Secretaries of the Interior and Local Government of the Philippines
Members of the House of Representatives of the Philippines from Antipolo
Kabalikat ng Malayang Pilipino politicians
Arroyo administration cabinet members
Estrada administration cabinet members